This article details the qualification procedures, formats and/or phases of the 2021 CAF Women's Champions League.

The qualification phases were made up of 6 sub-confederation qualifying tournaments which commenced on 24 July 2021 within UNAF for North Africa and the first half-zone of WAFU or WAFU's Zone A for West Africa. On 10 September 2021, qualification ended with the participating teams reduced to the final 8 which were made up of one winning team each from the 6 CAF sub-confederations (WAFU is split into two zones), the host nation's league-winning team and, for this edition only, an additional team from the sub-confederation of the incumbent Africa Women's Cup of Nations champions. These 8 teams would proceed to the main tournament, which was held across two stadiums in Cairo, Egypt, from 5 to 19 November 2021.

Participating teams
All participating teams qualified for the qualification phase via winning their respective national league titles and have their club licensing applications accepted by CAF. A total of 33 (out of 54) African confederation had a participant club in this first edition.

Associations which did not enter a team

Main Qualification Phase
Each of CAF's sub-confederations held a qualifying tournament, starting with UNAF for North Africa and WAFU's Zone A for West Africa. A single winner of each sub-confederation qualification tournament would advance to the final tournament where they would be joined by the host nation's league champions and another team from the sub-confederation of the incumbent Africa Women's Cup of Nations champions.

UNAF

The tournament took place in Berkane, Morocco.

WAFU Zone A

The tournament took place in Mindelo, Cape Verde.

WAFU Zone B

The tournament took place in Marcory, Ivory Coast from 24 July to 5 August 2021.

Group stage

Group 1

Group 2

Knockout stage

Semi-finals

Third place match

Final

UNIFFAC

The tournament was held from 1 August to 12 September 2021 in two-legged ties for the semi-finals.

Semi-finals

Final

CECAFA

The CECAFA qualification tournament was held from 28 August to 9 September in Nairobi, Kenya.

Group stage

Group A

Group B

Knockout stage

Semi-finals

Final

COSAFA

The draw for the qualification tournament for COSAFA teams (branded as the COSAFA Women's Champions League) was held on July 29, 2021. The seven teams were divided into two groups of four with the top two in each group advancing to the semi-finals. The tournament was held in South Africa from 26 to 31 August 2021.

Group stage

Group A

Group B

Knockout stage

Semi-finals

Final

References

External links
2021 CAF Women's Champions League – CAFOnline.com

 
2021
Women's Champions League
2021 in women's association football